Theodor Berge (April 5, 1869 – April 9, 1946) was a Norwegian actor and theater director.

From around 1900 onward, Berge was mainly associated with the Central Theater, where he played in and directed many comedies and plays. Among his most significant roles were Pastor Manders in Ghosts and Helmer in A Doll's House. As a director, he made a name for himself in his production of Little Eyolf in 1929. At the end of his career, he appeared in Norwegian films such as Den store barnedåpen (1931; Norway's first sound film), Vi som går kjøkkenveien (1933), and Trysil-Knut (1942).

Filmography
 1931: Den store barnedåpen as the parish priest
 1933: Vi som går kjøkkenveien as Breder
 1942: Trysil-Knut as the judge

References

External links
 
 Theodor Berge at the Swedish Film Database
 Theodor Berge at Filmfront

1869 births
1946 deaths
Norwegian male stage actors
Norwegian male film actors
20th-century Norwegian male actors
Actors from Bergen
Norwegian theatre directors